The 2004–05 Swiss Challenge League was the second season of the Swiss Challenge League, and the 73rd season of the second tier of the Swiss football league pyramid. It began on 30 July 2004 and ended on 28 May 2005. The champions of this season, Yverdon-Sport FC, earned promotion to the 2005–06 Super League. FC Bulle finished last and were relegated to the Swiss 1. Liga.

League table

Playoff
 1 June 2005: FC Schaffhausen - FC Vaduz  1-1
 12 June 2005: FC Vaduz - FC Schaffhausen  0-1

External links
Challenge League at Swiss Football League official website

Swiss Challenge League seasons
Swiss
2004–05 in Swiss football